This article details Crewe Alexandra F.C. records since the club's establishment in 1877.

Honours and achievements
Football League Second Division (3rd tier)
2nd place promotion: 2002–03
Play-off winners: 1997

Football League Fourth Division / League Two (4th tier)
2nd place promotion: 2019–20
3rd place promotion: 1962–63, 1993–94
4th place promotion: 1967–68, 1988–89
Play-off winners: 2012

Football League Trophy
Winners: 2013

Welsh Cup
Winners: 1936, 1937

Cheshire Senior Cup
Winners: 1910, 1912, 1913, 1923, 2002, 2003, 2017

Cheshire Premier Cup
Winners: 2009, 2010

Milk Cup
Premier Section Winners: 1987, 1999
Junior Section Winners: 1990, 1998

Club records

Football League record 
Including the 2021-2022 season, Crewe Alexandra has played in 98 Football League seasons. The club has never played in the top flight, and has played only 12 seasons in the second tier (four, from 1892 to 1896, when there were only two divisions); 47 seasons have been in the third tier (30 when there were only three tiers), and 39 in the fourth tier. In total, Crewe has played in the bottom division of the Football League in 73 seasons.

All-time league performances at each tier (Tier 4 incomplete)

Points as awarded at the time.

Cup records

Wins
 Biggest league win - 8–0 vs Rotherham United (Division 3 North, 1 October 1932) - six different Crewe scorers.
 Biggest cup win - 9–1 against Northwich Victoria (FA Cup, 16 November 1889)Eight goal margins also achieved (8-0 wins) against:
 Hartlepool United (Auto Windscreens Shield 1st Rd, 17 October 1995) - seven different Crewe scorers (plus an own goal).
 Doncaster Rovers (LDV Vans Trophy 3rd Rd, 10 November 2002)

Defeats
 Biggest league defeat - 1–11 vs Lincoln City (Division 3 North, 29 September 1951)
 Biggest cup defeat - 2–13 vs Tottenham Hotspur (FA Cup 4th Rd Replay, 3 February 1960)

Sequences
 Longest undefeated run in league - 19 (in 2011-12 season, 24 February 2012 to 17 May 2012 inclusive, including three play-off matches.)
 Longest league run without a win - 30 (22 September 1956 to 6 April 1957)
 Longest run without an away win - 56 (25 December 1954 to 24 April 1957)
 Longest run of home defeats - 8 (29 January to 2 April 2022)

League points
Most league points in a season
 Three points for win - 86 (2002-2003, Division 2)
 Two points for win - 59 (1962-1963, Division 4 - under 'three points for win' system, total would have been 83)

Least league points in a season
 Two points for win - 10 (1894-1895, Division 2 - 16 teams; Crewe lost all 15 away games that season)
 Two points for win - 21 (1956-1957, Division 3 North - 24 teams)
 Three points for win - 27 (1981-1982, Division 4 - 24 teams; tally would have been 21 under old points system)

Others
 Most goals in a season - 95 (in 40 games), 1931-32 Division 3 North
 Most clean sheets in a season - 24 (2002-2003, Clayton Ince 20 and Ademola Bankole 4)
 Most away wins in a single season - 17 (2002-2003 Division 2)

Player records

Appearances
 Youngest first-team player - Steve Walters, 16 years 119 days (vs Peterborough United, 6 May 1988)
 Oldest first-team player - Kenny Swain, 39 years 281 days (vs Maidstone United, 5 November 1991)
 Most consecutive League, FA Cup and League Cup appearances - Geoff Crudgington, 138 (between 17 August 1974 and 5 March 1977)

Most appearances
Competitive matches only, includes appearances as substitute. Numbers in brackets indicate goals scored.

Other players in current squad with most appearances :

 Kelvin Mellor - total: 125

Goalscorers
 Most league goals scored in a season - 35, Terry Harkin (Div 4, 1964–65)
 Most goals in a match - 5, Tony Naylor (vs Colchester United, Div 3, 24 April 1993)
 Most hat-tricks - 8, Frank Lord
 Most hat-tricks in a season - 4, Frank Lord (1961–62)
 Most hat-tricks in a match - 3, scored by Jack Waring, Tommy Armstrong and Joe Mawson in a 9-2 defeat of Llay Welfare in the Welsh Cup on 24 February 1937.
 Youngest goalscorer - David Jones, 16 years 144 days (vs Gateshead, 10 September 1956)
 Fastest goal - 16 seconds, by Tony Naylor (vs Mansfield Town, Div 4, 13 September 1991)
 Longest goalscoring streak - 7 games: Nicky Maynard (15 March to 19 April 2008; total 11 goals, including one hat-trick)Five players have scored in six consecutive games:
 Bert Llewellyn (19 September to 7 October 1959; total 11 goals, including two hat-tricks);
 Frank Lord (12-27 April 1963; total 11 goals, including two hat-tricks);
 Ashley Ward (12 November to 3 December 1994; total 10 goals, including two hat-tricks);
 David Platt (31 March - 25 April 1987; total 8 goals, including one hat-trick);
 Terry Harkin (16 January - 17 February 1965; total 7 goals).

Top goalscorers
Competitive matches only. Numbers in brackets indicate appearances made.

International caps
 First capped Crewe player - William Bell, for Wales v. Ireland in Wrexham, February 1886. 
 Most international caps while playing for Crewe - Clayton Ince, 31 caps for Trinidad and Tobago
 First (only) Crewe player to play in a World Cup final tournament - Efe Sodje (for Nigeria v. Argentina, 2 June 2002)

Transfers
 Highest transfer fee paid - £650,000 Rodney Jack from Torquay United in August 1998 (surpassing the £500,000 paid to Shrewsbury Town for Dave Walton in October 1997).
 Highest transfer fee received - £6 million for Nick Powell to Manchester United in 2012

Awards
PFA Awards (End-of-season Team of the Year awards, inaugurated in 1973)
 First PFA award winner - Defender Paul Edwards was the first Crewe player to feature, being named in the Third Division PFA Team of the Year in 1990.
 Most PFA awards - Neil Lennon won three awards while a Crewe player (in 1994, 1995 and 1996).
 Other PFA award winners -
Gareth Whalley and Danny Murphy (both in 1997)
Rob Hulse (2004)
Jon Otsemobor and Luke Varney (both in 2007)
John Brayford (2010)
Luke Murphy (2013)
Perry Ng and Charlie Kirk (both in 2020)

EFL Player of the Month (Monthly awards, inaugurated in 2004)
 First Player of the Month award winner - Striker Dean Ashton - named EFL Championship Player of the Month for December 2004.
 Other Player of the Month award winners - both for EFL League One Player of the Month:
Nicky Maynard - September 2006
Owen Dale - December 2020

Other
 Fastest sending-off - 19 seconds, Mark Smith (v. Darlington, Third Division, 12 March 1994)

Manager records

 Most games managed - 1,359: Dario Gradi (in four spells, 1983-2011)

Awards
 LMA League Two Manager of the Year - 1: David Artell (2019–20)
 LMA Manager of the Month - 1 each for Gudjon Thordarson (February 2009) and Dario Gradi (January 2011)

Attendances
 Highest home attendance - 20,000 vs Tottenham Hotspur (FA Cup fourth round), 30 January 1960.
 Highest home league attendance - 17,883 vs Port Vale, 21 September 1953.
 Highest home attendance (all-seater) - 10,092 vs Manchester City, 12 March 2002.
 Highest away attendance - 64,365 at Tottenham Hotspur's White Hart Lane (FA Cup fourth round replay), 3 February 1960.
 Lowest home league attendance - 1,009 vs Peterborough United, 4 February 1986.
 Highest season average attendance - 9,065 in 1950–51
 Lowest season average attendance - 1,817 in 1986–87

Notes and references

Notes

References

Source

Crewe Alexandra
Records and Statistics